Rogelio C. Melencio (September 27, 1939 – 1995), also known as Tembong Melencio, was a former Filipino basketball player and coach. Melencio was born in Tondo, Manila, Philippines. He played for the Yutivo Opels and later for Concepcion Industries in the Manila Industrial and Commercial Athletic Association. Melencio also appeared at the Olympic Games in Munich, Germany as a member of the country's national basketball team. He was also a key member of the Pesta Sukan Basketball Team, the 2nd national team of the Philippines beating the 1st national team in close exhibition games.

References

External links
 

1939 births
1995 deaths
People from Tondo, Manila
Basketball players from Manila
Filipino men's basketball coaches
Olympic basketball players of the Philippines
Basketball players at the 1968 Summer Olympics
Basketball players at the 1972 Summer Olympics
Philippines men's national basketball team players
Filipino men's basketball players
UE Red Warriors basketball players